Lee Bong-chang (August 10, 1900 – October 10, 1932) was a Korean independence activist during the Japanese occupation of Korea. In 1932, he attempted unsuccessfully to assassinate Japanese emperor Hirohito with a hand grenade, which became known as the Sakuradamon Incident.

Biography 
Born in Hanseongbu (present-day Seoul) to Lee Jin-gyu (이진규, 李鎭奎), Lee Bong-chang was raised in poverty. He graduated from Munchang Elementary School in Yongsan, later working as a shop clerk and an apprentice railroad engineer. In 1925, he traveled to Japan with his older brother, Lee Beom-tae. He was adopted by a Japanese family in Osaka and took on the Japanese name Kinoshita Shoichi (木下昌一).

He vowed to jump into the independence movement rather than wander around thinking that the Japanese invasion threatened the livelihood of the Korean people. In December 1930, he moved to Shanghai, China, and visited office in January 1931 to appeal for his dedication to the independence movement, but the executives of the group did not accept as his behavior was deemed suspicious.

However, Kim Gu, the president of the Provisional Government of the Republic of Korea and the leader of the independence movement, recognized Lee Bong-chang's true intentions. Lee joined the Korea Patriotic Legion, which Kim had organized, and made plans to assassinate Hirohito, the Japanese emperor.

After obtaining grenades, Lee made an oath at Kim Hae San's residence on December 13, 1931, saying: "I do swear, with singleness of heart, to become a member of the Korea Patriotic Legion, which is dedicated to restoring independence and liberty to our fatherland, and to slaughter the enemy's leader." A commemorative photograph was then taken with Lee holding a hand grenade in each hand. He then set off for Tokyo on December 17.

On January 8, 1932 at the Sakuradamon (櫻田門) gate of Tokyo's Imperial Palace, Lee Bong-chang hurled a pair of hand grenades at Hirohito. One of Hirohito's guards was injured, but the Japanese emperor escaped harm. Lee was arrested on the spot. He was sentenced to death in a secret trial, and was hanged at Ichigaya Prison.

Legacy 
After Korea achieved independence, Kim Gu interred Lee's remains at Hyochang Park, along with those of Yoon Bong-Gil and Baek Jeong-Gi (백정기, 白貞基). Their grave site is known as the Graves of the Three martyr (삼의사묘, 三義士墓). A statue of Lee wielding a hand grenade is also located at the park.

Lee was posthumously awarded the Order of Merit for National Foundation (Order of the President) in 1962.

See also 
An Jung-geun
Assassination attempts on Hirohito

References 

 Kim Gu, Baekbeomilji, Volume 2, Chapter 2: The Heroic Deeds of Lee Bong-chang and Yoon Bong-Gil (이봉창과 윤봉길의 의거).

1900 births
1932 deaths
Korean independence activists
People convicted on terrorism charges
People executed by Japan by hanging
People from Seoul
Recipients of the Order of Merit for National Foundation
Executed Korean people
20th-century executions by Japan
People executed for treason against Japan
Failed regicides
Hirohito
People executed for attempted murder
Korean assassins
Executed assassins